It's a Wonderful World is a 1956 British musical film directed by Val Guest and starring Terence Morgan, George Cole, Mylène Demongeot (in her first English-language film and listed in the credits as Mylène Nicole) and Kathleen Harrison. It also features Dennis Lotis, a popular singer at the time. It was made at Shepperton Studios. Songs include: Rosanne, When You Came Along, Girls! Girls! Girls! (Ted Heath, Moira Heath), A Few Kisses Ago (Robert Farnon, Val Guest), and The Hawaiian War Chant (Ted Heath).

Synopsis
In London, Ray and Ken (Morgan and Cole) are two struggling composers of popular songs, and they make friends with a young French singer, Georgie (Demongeot), newly arrived from Paris. She likes one of the songs Ray and Ken have written, and chooses to sing it when she gets an audition with bandleader Ted Heath (playing himself), and she is hired as their singer. Unaware of this, Ken stumbles across another route to success when his broken record player plays his records backwards, and he uses a tape recorder to create a piece of music by playing the recording tape backwards, which he thinks sounds similar to a newly successful kind of music. He attributes the music to a fictitious avant garde composer, Rimsikoff, living abroad, and when the music is performed at a concert, most of the public and critics are duped. Georgie discovers what they are doing and warns them off, and when they learn of her success with their song, they decide Rimsikoff will 'retire'.

Main cast
 Terence Morgan - as Ray Thompson
 George Cole - as Ken Miller
 Kathleen Harrison - as Miss Gilly
 Mylène Demongeot - as Georgie Dubois [credited as Mylène Nicole] 
 Dennis Lotis - as himself
 Ted Heath and His Music - as Themselves
 James Hayter - as Bert Fielding
 Harold Lang - as Mervyn Wade
 Maurice Kaufmann - as Paul Taylor
 Richard Wattis - as Harold
 Reginald Beckwith - as Professional Manager
 Charles Clay - as Sir Thomas van Broughton
 Derek Blomfield - as Arranger
 Sam Kydd - as Attendant
 Shirley Anne Field - as Pretty Girl [credited as Shirley Ann Field]
 Jon Pertwee - as Conductor [uncredited]
 Hal Osmond - as Removal Man

Critical reception
Allmovie wrote: "director Val Guest manages to extract new laughs out of such old setpieces as showing a snobbish audience being gradually won over by pop music. The principal attraction of It's a Wonderful World - to modern viewers, at least - is the presence of Ted Heath, whose screen appearances were rare."

References

External links
 
 
 

1956 films
British musical comedy films
1950s English-language films
Films directed by Val Guest
1956 musical comedy films
Films set in London
Films shot at Shepperton Studios
1950s British films